Qiupanykus (meaning "Qiupa claw" after the Qiupa Formation) is a genus of alvarezsaurid coelurosaur theropod from the Late Cretaceous Qiupa Formation of southern China.

Fossil eggs believed to be those of an oviraptorid found in association with the holotype specimen indicate that both Qiupanykus and other alvarezsaurids may have been specialist egg eaters that used their robust thumb claws to crack open eggshells.

Phylogeny
Lü Junchang et al. (2018) recovered Qiupanykus as a member of the Alvarezsauridae, falling closer to Parvicursor than to Patagonykus. Although not formally assigned to the clade Parvicursorinae in the description, this position would make it a member of Parvicursorinae sensu Xu et al. (2013).

References

Late Cretaceous dinosaurs of Asia
Alvarezsaurids
Fossil taxa described in 2018
Taxa named by Lü Junchang